Lars Figura (born 25 March 1976 in Bremen) is a former German sprinter who specialised in the 400 metres.

His personal best time is 45.93 seconds, achieved in June 2001 in Stuttgart.

Achievements

References 
 

1976 births
Living people
Sportspeople from Bremen
German male sprinters
German national athletics champions
University of Bremen alumni